Nothocercus  is a genus of birds in the tinamou family. This genus comprises three species of this South American family.

Nothocercus julius (the tawny-breasted tinamou) occupies humid montane forest at middle to high elevations in the Andes from Venezuela south to Peru. It is currently losing its habitat due to clearance of the forest due to agricultural and livestock grazing.

Etymology 
Nothocercus:  nothos “spurious”; κερκος kerkos “tail”

Species 
The species are:
 Nothocercus bonapartei, highland tinamou  located in the Andes of Colombia, Ecuador, northern Peru, western Venezuela, and the highlands of Costa Rica and western Panama
 Nothocercus bonapartei frantzii located in Costa Rica and western Panama
 Nothocercus bonapartei bonapartei located in northwestern Venezuela and northern Colombia
 Nothocercus bonapartei discrepans located in central Colombia
 Nothocercus bonapartei intercedens located in western Colombia
 Nothocercus bonapartei plumbeiceps located in eastern Ecuador and northern Peru
 Nothocercus julius, tawny-breasted tinamou located in the Andes of central Colombia, far western Venezuela, locally in Ecuador, and south central Peru
 Nothocercus nigrocapillus, hooded tinamou located in the Andes of Peru, and Bolivia
 Nothocercus nigrocapillus nigrocapillus located in central Peru and Bolivia
 Nothocercus nigrocapillus cadwaladeri located in northwestern Peru

Footnotes

References 
 
 
 
 ITIS

 
Bird genera
Taxa named by Charles Lucien Bonaparte